Melissa Palmer (born August 29, 1958) is an American hepatologist. She is recognized for her research and treatment of hepatitis and liver disease. Palmer is the Chief Medical Officer of Gannex Pharma, a wholly owned company of Ascletis Pharma.

Early life and education

Palmer was born in New York City, New York. She grew up in Forest Hills, Queens and attended Forest Hills High School (New York). She attended Columbia University, graduating with a Bachelor of Science degree.  Palmer attended medical school at the Mount Sinai School of Medicine, from which she graduated with a Doctor of Medicine degree in 1985.

Career
Palmer completed her internship and residency at Mount Sinai Beth Israel in Manhattan, New York, from 1985 to 1988, and
completed a fellowship in Hepatology at Mount Sinai. Palmer also completed a Gastroenterology fellowship at Stony Brook University Hospital.

It was during her fellowship at Mount Sinai that Palmer became the first to publish research demonstrating that if an overweight person who has liver-related abnormalities (such a person is considered to have NAFLD)  loses 10% of their body weight, it corrects these findings. Non-alcoholic Fatty Liver Disease  (NAFLD) is the most common liver disease worldwide, occurring in  30-40 percent of adults in the United States. This research study, published in the medical journal Gastroenterology in 1990, has been cited in almost 500 medical research articles. In addition, Palmer, either as primary author or co-author, published several guidelines with colleagues from the Food and Drug Administration (FDA) concerning how to detect, assess and manage suspected drug induced liver injury (hepatotoxicity) among patients participating in clinical trials evaluating potential drugs to treat liver diseases such as NASH, PBC, PSC, Viral Hepatitis B and C, and cirrhosis.

Palmer is the author of the book "Dr. Melissa Palmer's Guide to Hepatitis & Liver Disease" which is notable for being a comprehensive book on liver disease written for the general public as well as health care practitioners. Published in 2000, the book provides information on all facets of liver disease, including the function of the liver, liver blood tests, the symptoms and treatment of various liver diseases, cirrhosis, liver cancer, and the influence of lifestyle on liver disease. The book has been translated into several languages, including Spanish and Chinese. Palmer also co-authored and co-edited a medical textbook "The Gastrointestinal and Liver Disease Nutrition Desk Reference" with colleagues from Johns Hopkins Medical Center.

Palmer became the Chief Medical Officer of Gannex Pharma as of Dec. 2020.  Prior to joining Gannex, she was Head of Liver Disease Clinical Development at Takeda Pharmaceutical Company. She has also held leadership positions at Shire Pharmaceuticals and Kadmon Corporation, where she was in charge of the global development of Non-alcoholic steatohepatitis (NASH) and other liver disease programs. Prior to joining the pharmaceutical industry, she was clinical professor at NYU Langone Medical Center. From 1991 to 2011, Palmer operated a solo medical practice focused on liver disease.

Selected publications

Books
"Dr. Melissa Palmer's Guide to Hepatitis & Liver Disease"—New Revised Edition May 2004. (PenguinRandomHouse—Avery Division)  ; Chinese version July 2008. (Jilin Press, Jilin China) 
"Dr. Melissa Palmer's Guide to Hepatitis & Liver Disease"—Original Edition January 1, 2000. (PenguinRandomHouse—Avery Division)  ; Taiwanese version 2001 
"The Gastrointestinal and Liver Disease Nutrition Desk Reference", edited by Gerard Mullin,Laura Matarese and Melissa Palmer. Sept. 2011. (CRC Press)

Chapters
"Integrative Weight Management: A Guide for Clinicians (Nutrition and Health)"—Chapter on Non-Alcoholic Fatty Liver Disease. Gerald E. Mullin (Editor). May 2014. (Humana Press) 
"Textbook of Natural Medicine" 4th Edition—Chapter 173, on Hepatitis. Sept. 2012. (Elsevier) 
"Encyclopedia of Plagues, Pestilence and Pandemics"—Chapter on Hepatitis. Oct. 2008 (Greenwood Press)  
"Encyclopedia of Science and Technology"—Chapter on Cirrhosis. Feb. 2007. (McGraw-Hill) 
"The Autoimmune Connection"—Chapter on AutoImmune Hepatitis/PBC. April 2016. (McGraw-Hill)

Awards and distinctions
Fellow of AASLD. 2014–present 
Medical Advisory Board, Greater New York Chapter of the American Liver Foundation. 1991–present
Editorial Board, Practical Gastroenterology. 2009–present

References

American hepatologists
Icahn School of Medicine at Mount Sinai alumni
Columbia University alumni
Forest Hills High School (New York) alumni
People from Forest Hills, Queens
American women physicians
1958 births
Living people